Sayyid ul-Sadaat Sayyid Moinuddin Hadi Gilani-Naqshband al-Hasani wal-Husseini (died 5 May 1674), known as "Hazrat Naqshband Saheb" was a Sufi Saint from Bukhara and direct descendant of Prophet Muhammad, through his father Hazrat Ishaan. His father was a descendant and heir in the 7th Generation of Khwaja Bahauddin Naqshband. Moinuddin Naqshband succeeded his father in leading the Silsile Aliyya Naqshbandiyya.

Ancestry 
Hazrat Moinuddin Hadi Naqshband was a Sayyid, a direct descendant of the Islamic Prophet Muhammad through his daughter Fatima al Zahra and his son in law and cousin Ali ibn Abu Talib.

Paternal descendance 
Two paternal Sayyid lineages of him are currently known. From one line he is a direct descendant of the seventh Imam Musa al Kadhim, through his son Ibrahim al Murtadha and of the well known Sufi master Khwaja Sayyid Mir Alauddin Atar. Sayyid Alauddin Atar was the successor and son in law of Hazrat Bahauddin Naqshband. Therefore, Hazrat Ishaan is also from the progeny of Hazrat Bahauddin Naqshband. Bahauddin Naqshband was himself a patrilineal descendant of the eleventh Imam Hasan al Askari, through his son Sayyid Ali Akbar and also Sayyid Abdul Qadir Gilani through his grandmother. Hazrat Ishaan Saheb is also known to have a familiary relationship with the Sufi saint Farid ul-din Attar.

Education 
Khwaja Moinuddin Hadi Naqshbandi received his initial education from his father Hazrat Ishaan and then studied Hadith sciences under the guide of the prominent Hanafi scholar Khwaja Abdul Haq Muhaddis Dehlawi. As an outstanding student he received his Ijaza in Hadith and Fiqh from Khwaja Dehlawi and promoted the Naqshbandiyya way in Lahore and Kashmir alongside his father. He accompanied his father to Lahore by the request of Shah Jahan and settled back to Kashmir after the demise of his father, representing him there. As the Qutb of his time Islamic scholars in Punjab and Kashmir were dependent from his jurisprudence. Hence he has written many works under which one was a codification of his Fatwas called Futuwae Naqhbandiyya under which the scholars of his time profited.

Works 
Khwaja Moinuddin Hadi Naqshband has written many books:
Futawa Naqshbandiya
Kanzul Saadah
Miratul Qaloob
Sair-i- Khairul Bashar
Mirat-u-Tayibah
Risal dar Ahwal-i- Khwaja khawand Mahmood
Maqamat, Mashariqul Anwar
Risala dar-raddi-Mulahidah
Tafsir-i-Mushif Majeed
Risala Raddi

Spiritual rank 
Hazrat Moinuddin Hadi Naqshband was Qutb, the highest ranking Wali Allah (saint) of his time. The Qutb is known as the cosmic leader of the whole universe and righteous successor of prophet Muhammad. It is said that Hazrat Ishaan stated that under his progeny there will come a son of him, who will revive the spiritual lineage and legacy of him and who will take his place as Qutb after him. The awaited successor of the Naqshbandiyya was Sayyid ul Sadaat Hazrat Sayyid Mir Jan.

Successors 
Khwaja Moinuddin Hadi Naqshband was succeeded by his grandson Nizamuddin Naqshbandi, because his three sons Khwaja Jani, Khwaja Zia and Khwaja Sharifuddin Muhammad died before him. Since Khwaja Sharifuddin Muhammad's son Khwaja Nizamuddin Naqshbandi was still too young the wife of Khwaja Moinuddin Naqshband Saheb Gul Begum took over the responsibility of the Naqshbandiyya. The line of Khwaja Moinuddin Naqshband later died out after the martyrdom of his descendant Khwaja Kamaluddin Naqshbandi, but was revived by his descendant Sayyid ul Sadaat Hazrat Sayyid Mir Jan Naqshbandi in the mid 19th century.

Dakik Family 
In honor Sayyid Moinuddin´s father Hazrat Ishaan, Dakik Family also known as the House of Hazrat Ishaan are continuing his legacy. The Dakik Family are biological descendants of Sayyid Moinuddin Hadi Naqshband, whose descendants in the line of Sayyid Kamaluddin Mirza migrated to Kabul on the occasion of another Shiite revolt, that led to Sayyid Kamaluddin Mirza and his son Sayyid Abdul Khaliq Mirza being martyred. Sayyid Mir Jan belongs to this family and is the granduncle of the family´s matriarch, that married with a Prince of the Afghan Royal Family, acting as UN Ambassador.

See also 
Abdul Qadir Gilani
Sayyid Ali Akbar
Bahauddin Naqshband
Hazrat Ishaan
Sayyid Mir Jan
Sayyid Mahmud Agha
Mir Sayyid Ali Hamadani
Nund Reshi
Hamzah Makhdoom
Baba Naseeb-ud-Din Ghazi
Sultan Masood Dakik

References 

Sufi saints
1674 births
1674 deaths
People from Bukhara